Auden may refer to:

Auden (name), including a list of people with the given name and surname
W. H. Auden (1907–1973), Anglo-American poet
Auden, Ontario, in Unorganized Thunder Bay District, Canada
Auden station
Auden High School, Banashankari, Bangalore, India

See also

Auden Group, a 1930s group of British and Irish writers including W. H. Auden
Auden's Col, a mountain pass in the Himalayas